Tián, or T'ien in Wade-Giles is a Chinese surname.
An alternative transliteration of "田" from Cantonese is Tin, from Hokkien is Thinn. It appeared in the Hundred Family Surnames text from the early Song Dynasty. It also means "field". In 2019 it was the 34th most common surname in Mainland China.

The same character is Jeon in Korean hanja and is 16th most common in South Korea.

Origins 
 perhaps from a fief called Tian (田), which in Old Chinese is pronounced similar to (陳) in Qi state, which was granted to Chen Wan (陳完), a Prince in the State of Chen, who fled to Qi in order to escape persecution. The Qi clan also went on to rule Qi for many generations.
 possibly dates even further back to the post name of an official in charge of the management of farmlands who served the Shang dynasty
 adopted in place of the Chinese surname Huang (黃) by the son of the official Huang Zicheng during the Ming Dynasty, in order to avoid persecution.

Notable people 
 Tian Bingyi (born 1963), Chinese men's badminton player and 1992 Olympic medallist
 Tian Bu (785–822), military general of the Chinese Tang dynasty
 Tian Chengping (born 1945), Chinese communist politician
 Tian Chengsi (705–779), military general of the Chinese rebel state Yan
 Tien Chung-kwang, Deputy Minister of Foreign Affairs of the Republic of China (2020-)
 Tian Dan (fl. 300 BC), military general during ancient China's Warring States period
 Tian Feng (died 200), advisor to Yuan Shao during the late Han Dynasty
 Tian Fengshan (born 1940), Chinese communist official
 Gang Tian (born 1958), Chinese-American mathematician
 Tian Han (1898–1968), Chinese revolutionary lyricist and playwright, wrote March of the Volunteers
 Tian Hongzheng (764–821), military general during the Chinese Tang Dynasty
 Tian Houwei (born 1992), Chinese men's badminton player
 Hebe Tien (born 1983), a famous Taiwanese Mando-pop singer, and member of S.H.E
 Tian Huaijian (fl. 800), military general during the Chinese Tang Dynasty
 Tian Ji (fl. 300 BC), military general of the Qi state during the early Warring States period
 Tian Jia (born 1981), Chinese female beach volleyball player
 Tian Ji'an (781 or 782–812), military general during the Chinese Tang Dynasty
 Tin Ka Ping or Tian Jiabing (1919–2018), Hong Kong entrepreneur and philanthropist
 Tian Jianxia (born 1986), Chinese men's handball player
 Tian Jiyun (born 1929), Chinese communist politician
 Tian Jun (858–903), warlord during the late Chinese Tang Dynasty
 Tian Jun (rower)  (born 1982), Chinese male rower
 Tian Kai (died 199), Chinese official in Qing Province during the Chinese Tang Dynasty
 Tian Kehan, honorific name used to refer to various Chinese leaders
 Tian Liang (rower) (born 1986), Chinese female Olympic rower
 Tian Liang (born 1979), Chinese male diver and two-time Olympic champion
 Tian Liming (born 1955), Chinese painter and artist
 Tian Lingzi (died 893), eunuch during the reign of Emperor Xizong of Tang
 Tian Mingjian (1964–1994), Chinese First Lieutenant and spree killer
 Tian Pengfei (born 1987), Chinese male snooker player
 Tian Qing (born 1986), Chinese women's badminton player
 Tian Songyao (1888–1975), Chinese warlord of the Sichuan clique and later Kuomintang general
 Tian Tian (chess player) (born 1983), Chinese female chess grandmaster
 Tian Wang, honorific name used to refer to various Chinese leaders
 Tian Xiusi (born 1950), Chinese communist politician and military general
 Tian Xu, military general during the late Chinese Han Dynasty
 Tian Xu (Tang Dynasty) (764–796), military general during the Chinese Tang Dynasty
 Tian Ye (born 1972), Chinese former football goalkeeper
 Tian Ye (born 1982), male Chinese cross-country skier and biathlete
 Tian Yi (1534–1605), Ming Dynasty court eunuch
 Tian Yu (171-252), military general of the state of Cao Wei
 Tian Yue (751–784), military general during the Chinese Tang Dynasty
 Tian Yunzhang (born 1945), Chinese calligrapher and academic
 Tian Yuan (singer) (born 1985), Chinese musician and actress
 Tian Yuan (table tennis) (born 1975), Chinese-Croatian table tennis player
 Tian Yuan (weightlifter) (born 1993), Chinese female weightlifter
 Tian Yumei (born 1965), Chinese former sprint athlete
 Tian Zhen (born 1966), Chinese rock singer
 Tian Zhuangzhuang (born 1952), Chinese film director and producer
 Chang-Lin Tien or Tian Changlin (1935–2002), Chancellor of the University of California, Berkeley (1990–97)
 James Tien (actor), Chinese actor
 James Tien (politician) (born 1947), a Hong Kong businessman and politician, current Chairman of the Liberal Party
 Michael Tien, brother of James Tien (politician)
John Tien, American military and government official

Fictional characters 
 Tian Hu, antagonist in the Water Margin
 Tian Qilang, protagonist of a short story with the same name in Strange Tales from a Chinese Studio

See also 
 
 Tian (given name)
 Rulers of Zhou Feudal State of Qi
 Tian (disambiguation)

References 

Chinese-language surnames
Individual Chinese surnames